Building Sites Bite is a public information film produced by the Central Office of Information for the Health and Safety Executive and the Mighty Movie Company for British schools to warn children about the dangers of playing on building sites. It was written and directed by David Hughes and produced by Maggie Evans. The film was shot in early 1978 and is 28 minutes in duration. Because of the style of filming and grim subject matter, it is often compared to the earlier films Apaches and The Finishing Line, both released the previous year.

Plot
The informative film focuses entirely on the perspective of Ronald, a young boy who aspires to become a builder or surveyor when he grows up. His cousins Paul and Jane decide to test Ronald's know-it-all attitude by teleporting him to a building site, where Ronald must avoid several hazards and obstacles without getting hurt. In each test Ronald disobeys various warning signs and ignores the dangers, resulting in him getting killed in each one.

Each time Ronald is about to die a heartbeat sound is played to warn sensitive viewers. In order, Ronald's deaths are displayed as him being buried alive in a trench collapse, electrocuted in a condemned building, run over by an earthmoving vehicle, breaking his skull against a metal retaining wall, crushed to death by a pile of bricks and finally drowning in a disused quarry.

Back in the real world, Ronald announces he intends to abandon his ambitions, and goes outside to play with Paul and Jane. Over the closing shot of the film, Paul reads out real-life stories of children who were killed in similar ways to those seen in the film.

Home viewing availability
Building Sites Bite was made available for home viewing by the BFI in 2010, along with other such public information films of the time such as Apaches, on the compilation DVD COI Collection Vol 4: Stop! Look! Listen!

External links
 Production details at the BFI website 

1978 films
Public information films
Child safety
Construction safety
British documentary films
1970s educational films
1970s British films
British educational films